Mahmudabad (also Romanized as Maḩmūdābād; also known as Maḩmūdābād-e Sakhteman) is a village in Bid Zard Rural District, in the Central District of Shiraz County, Fars Province, Iran. At the 2006 census, its population was 900, in 216 families.

References 

Populated places in Shiraz County